The Municipal Buildings are based on the north side of High East Street in Dorchester, Dorset, England. The structure, which was the headquarters of Dorchester Borough Council, is a Grade II* listed building.

History
The first town hall in Dorchester, which was described as a "spacious and handsome edifice", was completed in 1791. It was arcaded on the ground floor, so that markets could be held, with an assembly room on the first floor. After Dorchester became a municipal borough in 1835, civic leaders decided to replace the old town hall with a new structure.

The new building was designed by Benjamin Ferrey in the Gothic Revival style, built by Samuel Slade in brown Broadmayne bricks with stone dressings and was completed in 1848. The design involved a symmetrical main frontage with five bays facing onto High East Street; the central bay featured a doorway with a fanlight flanked by Corinthian order columns supporting a triangular hood mould bearing the borough coat of arms; there were arched openings in the other bays on the ground floor and there were five mullion windows on the first floor. The roofline on the main frontage was crenelated. The North Square elevation featured a prominent two-storey oriel window which was also crenelated. A turret with a clock and a spire was attached at the southwest corner in 1864. Internally, a corn exchange was established on the ground floor while a town hall and a council chamber were accommodated on the first floor. Pevsner described the building as the "visual climax" to views along the High Streets.

After a fall in price of English corn as a result of cheap imports in the 1870s, the openings on the ground floor were filled in with windows and the former corn exchange was subsequently used as an events venue: the novelist, Thomas Hardy, attended a rehearsal of his play, The Famous Tragedy of the Queen of Cornwall at Tintagel in Lyonnesse, which was performed by the Hardy Players, there in summer 1923.

The municipal buildings remained the headquarters of Dorchester Borough Council for much of the 20th century but ceased to be the local seat of government when the enlarged West Dorset District Council was established at council offices in High West Street in 1974. The roof of the municipal buildings complex was completely replaced in spring 2021. In March 2021 the Dorchester Town Council announced proposals for further improvement works including new offices for town council officers at the rear of the municipal buildings: this would enable officers to relocate from their current premises at 19 North Square. Following the completion of the works, which were estimated to cost £2 million, the building would re-open under the management of Dorchester Arts, an organisation supported by Arts Council England, in autumn 2021.

See also
 Grade II* listed buildings in West Dorset

References

Government buildings completed in 1848
City and town halls in Dorset
Buildings and structures in Dorchester, Dorset
Grade II* listed buildings in Dorset